The 2009 Women's Hockey Asia Cup was the seventh edition of the women's field hockey tournament. It was held in Bangkok  from 29 October to 8 November 2009.

China won the tournament for the second time, defeating India 5–3 in the final. South Korea finished in third place after defeating Japan 4–3 in the third place playoff.

The tournament served as a qualifier for the 2010 FIH World Cup, with the top two teams qualifying.

Competition format
The teams were divided into Pool A and Pool B. The competition comprised a single round-robin format in each pool, with each team playing each other once. At the conclusion of the pool stage, the top two teams advanced to the medal round, while the remaining teams played off for classifications.

Teams
The following teams participated in the tournament:

 (defending champions)

Officials
The following umpires were appointed by the Asian Hockey Federation and the FIH to officiate the tournament:

 Miskarmalia Ariffin (MAS)
 Thanita Chungmanichot (THA)
 Elena Eskina (RUS)
 Carolina de la Fuente (ARG)
 Nor Piza Hassan (MAS)
 Amy Hassick (USA)
 Lim Mi-Sook (KOR)
 Anupama Puchimanda (IND)
 Annie Thomas (MAS)
 Liu Xiaoying (CHN)
 Yumiko Yasuoka (JPN)
 Kitty Yau (HKG)

Results
All times are local (ICT).

Preliminary round

Pool A

Pool B

Classification round

Ninth to eleventh place classification

Crossover

Ninth and tenth place

Fifth to eighth place classification

Crossover

Seventh and eighth place

Fifth and sixth place

First to fourth place classification

Semi-finals

Third and fourth place

Final

Final standings

Goalscorers

References

Women's Hockey Asia Cup
Asia Cup
International women's field hockey competitions hosted by Thailand
Hockey Asia Cup
Hockey Asia Cup
Asia Cup